Load balancing or load distribution may refer to:
Load balancing (computing), balancing a workload among multiple computer devices
Load balancing (electrical power), the storing of excess electrical power by power stations during low demand periods, for release as demand rises
Network load balancing, balancing network traffic across multiple links
Weight distribution, the apportioning of weight within a vehicle, especially cars, airplanes, and watercraft
Production leveling, a prerequisite to allow 'flow' in the factory
Resource leveling, a group of techniques for distribution of a workload between workers.